Jakub Szymański (born 22 July 2002) is a Polish athlete competing in the sprint hurdles. He won a bronze medal at the 2021 World U20 Championships.

His personal bests are 13.82 seconds in the 110 metres hurdles (-0.9 m/s, Sopot 2021) and 7.59 seconds in the 60 metres hurdles (Belgrade 2022).

International competitions

References

2002 births
Living people
Polish male hurdlers
21st-century Polish people